This is a list of notable television stations that broadcast in the Odia language, the official language of Odisha, India.

Government-owned channel

General entertainment

Defunct channels

News

Defunct channels

Movies

Music

Kids

Defunct channel

Audio feed

Religious

HD channels

General entertainment

Cable channels

General entertainment

News

Movies

Music

Religious

Digital channels

General entertainment

News

Music

See also
List of 4K channels in India
List of HD channels in India

References

Odia
 
Odia